The Muirfield Seamount is a submarine mountain located in the Indian Ocean approximately 130 kilometres (70 nautical miles) southwest of the Cocos (Keeling) Islands. The Cocos Islands are an Australian territory, and therefore the Muirfield Seamount is within Australia's Exclusive Economic Zone (EEZ). A 1999 biological survey of the seamount performed by the Australian Commonwealth Scientific and Industrial Research Organisation (CSIRO) revealed that the area is depauperate.

In 1983, a Royal Australian Navy survey ship, surveyed the area where Muirfield was damaged, and charted in detail this previously unsuspected hazard to navigation.

The dramatic accidental discovery of the Muirfield Seamount is often cited as an example of limitations in the vertical datum accuracy of some offshore areas as represented on nautical chart especially on small-scale charts.

See also 
 Graveyard Seamounts
 Jasper Seamount
 Muirfield Reef
 Mud volcano
 Sedlo Seamount
 South Chamorro Seamount

References

External links
 

Physical oceanography
Seamounts of the Indian Ocean
Former islands from the last glacial maximum